The 1958 Maryland gubernatorial election was held on November 4, 1958. Democratic nominee J. Millard Tawes defeated Republican nominee James Devereux with 63.55% of the vote.

Primary elections
Primary elections were held on May 20, 1958.

Democratic primary

Candidates
J. Millard Tawes, Comptroller of Maryland
Bruce S. Campbell
Morgan L. Amaimo
Joseph A. Phillips

Results

General election

Candidates
J. Millard Tawes, Democratic
James Devereux, Republican

Results

References

1958
Maryland
Gubernatorial
November 1958 events in the United States